Sir Henry Trentham Butlin, 1st Baronet FRCS (24 October 1845 – 24 January 1912) was a British surgeon considered the "father of British head and neck surgery".

Butlin was created a Baronet of Harley Street in the Metropolitan Borough of St Marylebone on 28 June 1911. Sir Henry was succeeded by his son, Henry Guy Trentham Butlin, upon whose death in 1916 the baronetcy became extinct.

He was also the great uncle of Sir Billy Butlin.

References 

1845 births
1912 deaths
British surgeons
Fellows of the Royal College of Surgeons
Baronets in the Baronetage of the United Kingdom